Stephen "Steve" Raw (born 27 February 1966) is a retired English professional darts player, who played in Professional Darts Corporation events.

Career
Raw played in six PDC World Darts Championships between 1996 and 2001, with his best run being to the Last 16 in 2000, before losing to Peter Evison.

World Championship performances

PDC
 1996: Last 24 Group: (beat to Gary Mawson 3–0 & lost to Peter Evison 2–3)
 1997: Last 24 Group: (beat to Cliff Lazarenko 3–1 & lost to Peter Evison 1–3)
 1998: Last 24 Group: (beat to Eric Bristow 3–0 & lost to Dennis Priestley 0–3)
 1999: Last 32: (lost to Graeme Stoddart 1–3)
 2000: Last 16: (lost to Peter Evison 1–3)
 2001: Last 32: (lost to Alex Roy 2–3)

References

External links

1966 births
Living people
English darts players
Professional Darts Corporation early era players